Lee Jung-eun (born 2 May 1987) is a South Korean sport shooter.

She participated at the 2018 ISSF World Shooting Championships, winning a medal.

References

External links

Living people
1987 births
South Korean female sport shooters
ISSF pistol shooters
Asian Games medalists in shooting
Shooters at the 2014 Asian Games
Asian Games gold medalists for South Korea
Medalists at the 2014 Asian Games
20th-century South Korean women
21st-century South Korean women